Primrose Valley is a coastal village south of Filey, North Yorkshire, England, within the Scarborough local government area. It was historically part of the East Riding of Yorkshire until 1974.

It had a population of 451 in the 2011 census.

Tourism

Primrose Valley Holiday Park is a caravan park owned by Haven Holidays. The park is touted as one of their flagship parks, and as one of their largest. Part of the site was previously occupied by Butlin's Filey.

Filey Bay Beach, accessed from Primrose Valley, is consistently ranked one of the best in the country.

References

Villages in North Yorkshire
Holiday camps
Filey